RAF Akrotiri  is a large Royal Air Force base on the Mediterranean island of Cyprus. It is located in the Western Sovereign Base Area, one of two areas which comprise Akrotiri and Dhekelia, a British Overseas Territory, administered as a Sovereign Base Area.

The station commander has a dual role and is also the officer commanding the Akrotiri or Western Sovereign Base Area, reporting to the commander of British Forces Cyprus who is also the Administrator.

History
RAF Akrotiri was first constructed in the mid-1950s to relieve pressure on the main RAF station on the island, RAF Nicosia.

Suez Crisis

In late 1956, relations between the United Kingdom and Egypt had reached a crisis. The Suez Crisis saw a further increase in the strength of RAF forces in Cyprus. Akrotiri was mainly an airfield for fighter, photo reconnaissance and ground attack aircraft. Its regular squadrons of Gloster Meteor night fighters, English Electric Canberra photo reconnaissance aircraft and de Havilland Venom ground attack machines were reinforced by further Canberras which were ready for action if Egypt attacked Israel.

1960s
After the Suez Crisis, the main emphasis of life on the airfield shifted to helping quell the EOKA revolt and training missions. After the withdrawal from both Egypt and Iraq, and Suez Crisis, it was clear that a command centred on Cyprus could not control units stationed in the Arabian Peninsula, of which there were still many. Consequently, the Middle East Command was split, with that east of Suez being controlled from Aden, Yemen, and the remainder being renamed the Near East Command, controlled from Cyprus. From 1957 to 1969, four squadrons operating the Canberra (No. 6 Squadron, No. 32 Squadron, No. 73 Squadron, and No. 249 Squadron) provided first a conventional and then from November 1961, a nuclear striking capability as part of the Baghdad Pact, later the Central Treaty Organization (CENTO).

Akrotiri, along with Nicosia, assumed a very important status, as virtually the sole means for projecting British airpower into the eastern Mediterranean, outside of aircraft carriers. In 1960, independence was granted to Cyprus, with the RAF maintaining both RAF Nicosia and RAF Akrotiri as airfields, controlled by the Near East Air Force. However, Akrotiri assumed more importance as Nicosia was used for greater civil aviation traffic. After 1966, it was no longer possible to maintain RAF units at Nicosia due to pressures of space, and Akrotiri became the only RAF flying station left on the island.

1970s
In August 1970, detachment "G" of the Central Intelligence Agency arrived at the airfield with Lockheed U-2 reconnaissance aircraft to monitor the Egypt/Israel Suez Canal fighting and cease fire. Permanent monitoring of Middle East Ceasefire was undertaken by the 100th Strategic Reconnaissance Wing after the 1973 Yom Kippur War, known as Operation "OLIVE HARVEST".

Up until 1974 RAF Akrotiri had a balanced force of aircraft assigned to it, including No. 9 Squadron and No. 35 Squadron, both flying Avro Vulcan strategic bombers. The Vulcans provided a bomber force for CENTO, one of the three main anti-Communist mutual defence pacts signed in the early days of the Cold War. However, during that year, Turkish forces invaded Cyprus in connection with a Greek-sponsored coup. The UK then evacuated most of the RAF from Akrotiri as the CENTO treaty had degenerated to the point of uselessness. The two Vulcan squadrons left for UK stations in 1975. What was left at the airfield was the flying unit that is permanently assigned to the station to this day; No. 84 Squadron, a helicopter search and rescue unit. In addition, the role of No. 34 Squadron RAF Regiment provided support.

In September 1976 the US U-2 operations were turned over to the 9th Strategic Reconnaissance Wing (9th SRW) but the U-2 operation at RAF Akrotiri continued to be called Operating Location (OLIVE HARVEST) OH until September 1980. Thereafter it became Detachment 3 of the 9th SRW, although the name OLIVE HARVEST continues. Two U-2s are stationed at RAF Akrotiri and they are still monitoring the ceasefire agreement between the Egypt and Israel although the present operations in the US Central Command area requires further missions. U-2s also transit through RAF Akrotiri either on going into the Central Command theatre or returning to Beale AFB, California.

1980s
Due to the station's relative proximity to the Middle East, it was used for the reception of American casualties after the 1983 Beirut barracks bombing.

Between April 1983 and September 1984, RAF Boeing Chinooks helicopters deployed to Akrotiri in support of British United Nations forces in Lebanon (UNIFIL).

In the mid-1980s, the US launched retaliatory attacks against Libya after the country's leader, Muammar al-Gaddafi, was implicated in the bombing of a West Berlin discotheque. Although the bombing operations were staged out of the UK, Akrotiri was employed in the role of an alternate in case of emergency, and was used as such by at least one aircraft. This led to retaliatory action against the British base.

2000s - 2010s

In July 2006, RAF Akrotiri played a major role as a transit point for personnel evacuations out of Lebanon during the 2006 Lebanon War (see International reactions to the 2006 Lebanon War and Joint Task Force Lebanon).

Akrotiri was the location of the main transmitter of the well known numbers station, the Lincolnshire Poacher, although transmissions ceased in 2008.

In March 2011, the station was used as a staging base for support aircraft involved in Operation Ellamy, the UK's contribution to the NATO-led military intervention in Libya. Tanker support and logistical units were based here to support aerial operations over the country.

In August 2013, six RAF Eurofighter Typhoon aircraft were deployed to Akrotiri to defend the base, "to ensure the protection of UK interests and the defence of our sovereign base areas at a time of heightened tension in the wider region". Earlier two Lockheed Tristar aerial refueling aircraft and a Boeing Sentry AEW1 had been deployed to Akrotiri.

The station hosted the main hospital for British Forces Cyprus, The Princess Mary's Hospital (TPMH), located on Cape Zevgari. This closed in October 2012 and cases too serious to be dealt with at the base health clinic are sent to the private Ygia Polyclinic in Limassol.

In August 2014, six RAF Panavia Tornado fighter/bombers were deployed to Akrotiri to carry out reconnaissance missions over Iraq, following the rise of Islamic State (ISIS) in Iraq and Syria. On 26 September 2014, Members of Parliament voted in favour of the RAF carrying out air strikes on ISIS in Iraq, and on 27 September the first two Tornado jets took off from Akrotiri loaded with laser-guided bombs and missiles. On 30 September 2014, two British Tornados successfully attacked and intercepted ISIS targets of a heavily armed truck, at the request of Iraqi Kurdish fighters.

The station was used to support the 2018 missile strikes against Syria.

In June 2019, the station launched the RAF's first F-35 Lightning II operational sortie. Six aircraft were deployed to take part in operations against Islamic State.

Controversy

Radar 
In 2007 a large over-the-horizon radar antenna was erected within the base.  Several demonstrations and protests took place, with the most memorable incident being the act of MP (MEP since 2004) Marios Matsakis chaining himself to the antenna.  Matsakis stated "It is outrageous that in the 21st century there are Cypriot villages living under British military rule, neither under their own government's jurisdiction nor under the protection of the EU treaties".

US surveillance flights 
In 2010, U-2s from the United States Air Force's 9th Reconnaissance Wing were used in Operation Cedar Sweep to fly surveillance over Lebanon, relaying information about Hezbollah militants to Lebanese authorities, and in Operation Highland Warrior to fly surveillance over Turkey and northern Iraq to relay information to Turkish authorities. These flights were the topic of acrimonious diplomatic cables between British officials and the American embassy, later leaked by WikiLeaks, with David Miliband saying that "policymakers needed to get control of the military". The British were concerned that the flights over Lebanon were authorised by the Lebanese Ministry of Defence rather than the entire cabinet, and that the intelligence so gained could lead to the UK being complicit in the unlawful torture of detainees. After warnings that these issues "could jeopardize future use of British territory", John Rood, a senior Bush administration official, and Mariot Leslie, the Foreign Office's director general for defence and intelligence, became involved. Leslie said that the U.S. was not actually expected to check on detained terrorists, but that future spy missions would require full written applications.

Based units
Units based at RAF Akrotiri.

Royal Air Force 
No. 2 Group (Air Combat Support) RAF
No. 84 Squadron – Bell Griffin HAR2
No 83. Expeditionary Air Group RAF
No. 903 Expeditionary Air Wing
Operation Shader (anti-ISIL operations)
 Detachment of 9 x Eurofighter Typhoon FGR.4 from RAF Coningsby
 Detachment of 1 x Airbus Voyager KC.2/3
 Detachment of 1 x Lockheed Hercules C.5
Other

 RAF Akrotiri Volunteer Band

Joint service units 

 Cyprus Operations Support Unit

United States Air Force 

 9th Reconnaissance Wing
 9th Operations Group (Detachment 1) – Lockheed U-2S

Airlines and destinations

See also
 Richard Haine
 List of Royal Air Force stations
 United States Air Forces in Europe
 Dreamer's Bay

References

Citations

Bibliography

 David Lee, Wings in the Sun: A history of the Royal Air Force in the Mediterranean 1945–1986, HMSO Books 1989

External links 

 
 UK Military Aeronautical Information Publication – Akrotiri (LCRA)

1956 establishments in Cyprus
Royal Air Force stations in Cyprus
Sovereign Base Areas
Military of Sovereign Base Areas of Akrotiri and Dhekelia
Airports in Cyprus
RAF